Tianhe or Tian He, may refer to:

Locations in China 
Tianhe District (天河区), in Guangzhou, Guangdong
Wuhan Tianhe International Airport (武汉天河国际机场), Hubei
Tianhe, Guangxi (天河镇), a town in Luocheng Mulao Autonomous County, Guangxi

Subdistricts
Tianhe Subdistrict, Weihai (田和街道), in Huancui District, Weihai, Shandong
Tianhe Subdistrict, Chaohu, Anhui
Tianhe Subdistrict, Wuhan, in Huangpi District, Wuhan, Hubei
Tianhe Subdistrict, Wenzhou, in Longwan District, Wenzhou, Zhejiang

Other uses
 Tianhe core module (天和, "Harmony of heaven"), the core module of the Chinese Tiangong Space Station 
 Tianhe-1 and Tianhe-2, supercomputers built by China
 Duke Tai of Tian Qi (died 384 BC), personal name Tian He, ruler of Qi during the Warring States period
 The Galaxy on Earth, a 2014 Chinese film
 HE Tian (Tian He), a fictional character from Unruly Qiao
 Tianhe (天河, "heavenly river"), an archaic Chinese name for the Milky Way Galaxy

See also 

 
 He Tian (disambiguation)
 Tian (disambiguation)
 He (disambiguation)